Websterite is ultramafic igneous rock that consists of roughly equal proportions of orthopyroxene and clinopyroxene. It is a type of pyroxenite. 

Websterite is named after the town Webster in North Carolina.

References

Plutonic rocks
Ultramafic rocks